Il Sole 24 Ore is the Italian financial newspaper of record, owned by Confindustria, the Italian employers' federation.

History and profile
Il Sole 24 Ore was first published on 9 November 1965 as a merger between Il Sole ("the sun"), founded in 1865, and 24 Ore ("24 hours"), founded in 1933. The latter was established by young economists, including Ferdinando di Fenizio, Libero Lenti and Roberto Tremelloni, on 15 February 1933. The owner of Il Sole 24 Ore is Confindustria.

Il Sole 24 Ore has its headquarters in Milan and is published in broadsheet format. The paper reports on business, politics, developments in commercial and labour law, corporate news and features. Extensive share and financial product listings are provided in its daily supplement, Finanza e Mercati.

Weekly supplements include:
Domenica (Sunday): art, literature, philosophy, theatre, cinema, book reviews, and related news;
Plus24 (Saturday): family savings, market analysis, real estate market news, and other private investment topics;
Nòva 24 (Sunday): science and technology.
 
Irregular supplements are also produced with a focus on a specific issue such as a particular business sector.

Circulation
The 1988 circulation of Il Sole 24 Ore was 320,000 copies. In 1997 it was the fifth best-selling Italian newspaper with a circulation of 368,652 copies.

The paper sold 520,000 copies in 2000 and 414,000 copies in 2001. In 2004 the paper had a circulation of 373,723 copies, making it the fourth best-selling newspaper in Italy. Its circulation was 334,076 copies in 2008. The print and digital circulation in 2017 was nearly 177,000 copies. In the course of 2017, its circulation increased again in the ranking of national newspapers with the highest diffusion from fourth to third place. (Source Budget 2017)

The information integrated system

The printed newspaper is presented as part of an integrated information system which includes:
Radio 24: a news/talks fm/online radio channel;
Il Sole 24 Ore Radiocor: business and financial news agency;
24 Minuti: a defunct free daily newspaper;
ilsole24ore.com: the online newspaper;
24ore.tv: a defunct financial all-news TV channel.

Professional services
Il Sole 24 ORE is published by 24 Ore Group. In the field of services tailored to professionals and businesses, the Group enjoys a solid competitive market position thanks to its databanks, online services and training programs.
Listed on the Italian Stock Exchange since 6 December 2007, the 24 ORE Group has also carved itself a unique place in the organization of exhibitions and cultural events through 24 ORE Cultura, one of the most prominent players on the market.

References

External links
  
 24 Ore Group website 

1965 establishments in Italy
Business newspapers published in Italy
Italian-language newspapers
Italian news websites
Daily newspapers published in Italy
Newspapers published in Milan
Publications established in 1965